Honorary titles of the Russian Federation are titles given to citizens of the Russian Federation for professional and/or social achievements, but can be revoked by a vote in the State Duma. Rejection of honorary titles cannot be veto'd by the President. The word  translates as "Honoured".

During the period of the Soviet Union, a system of professional honorary titles was created to be used across the USSR to recognize outstanding personal professional achievements.  The awards were also used in some other Eastern bloc states and communist countries.  Post-Soviet states modelled some of their awards on the Soviet award system.

On 30 December 1995, Russian President Boris Yeltsin signed Presidential Decree № 1341 on the establishment of the system of honorary titles of the Russian Federation. Prior to that, the legal acts referred to honorary titles of the RSFSR. Most of the Soviet awards have been retained in the Russian Federation.

List of honorary titles
Hero of the Russian Federation
Hero of Labour of the Russian Federation
Pilot-Cosmonaut of the Russian Federation
Honoured Military Pilot of the Russian Federation
Honoured Military Navigator of the Russian Federation
People's Artist of the Russian Federation
Honoured Agronomist of the Russian Federation (abolished)
Honoured Architect of the Russian Federation
Honoured Veterinarian of the Russian Federation (abolished)
Honoured Military Specialist of the Russian Federation
Honoured Doctor of the Russian Federation
Honoured Geologist of the Russian Federation
Honoured Worker of the Arts Industry of the Russian Federation
Honoured Scholar of the Russian Federation
Honoured Land Surveyor of the Russian Federation
Honoured Livestock Specialist of the Russian Federation (abolished)
Honoured Inventor of the Russian Federation (abolished)
Honoured Builder of the Russian Federation
Honoured Forestry Specialist of the Russian Federation
Honoured Test Pilot of the Russian Federation
Honoured Master of Vocational Training of the Russian Federation
Honoured Engineer of the Russian Federation
Honoured Ameliorator the Russian Federation (abolished)
Honoured Metallurgist of the Russian Federation
Honoured Meteorologist Russian Federation
Honoured Metrologist of the Russian Federation (abolished)
Honoured Agricultural Engineer of the Russian Federation (abolished)
Honoured Pilot of the Russian Federation
Honoured Worker of Public Services of the Russian Federation (abolished)
Honoured Worker of Geodesy and Cartography of the Russian Federation
Honoured Worker of Housing and Communal Services of the Russian Federation
Honoured Worker of Health Services of the Russian Federation
Honoured Worker of Culture of the Russian Federation
Honoured Worker of the Forest Industry of the Russian Federation
Honoured Worker of the Oil and Gas Industry of the Russian Federation
Honoured Worker of the Food Industry of the Russian Federation
Honoured Worker of Fisheries of the Russian Federation
Honoured Worker of Communications of the Russian Federation
Honoured Worker of Agriculture of the Russian Federation
Honoured Worker of Social Services of the Russian Federation
Honoured Worker of the Textile and Light Industries of the Russian Federation
Honoured Worker of the Trade Industry of the Russian Federation (abolished)
Honoured Worker of the Transport Industry of the Russian Federation
Honoured Worker of Physical Culture of the Russian Federation
Honoured Innovator of the Russian Federation (abolished)
Honoured Rescuer of the Russian Federation
Honoured Builder of the Russian Federation
Honoured Teacher of the Russian Federation
Honoured Chemist of the Russian Federation
Honoured Artist of the Russian Federation
Honoured Miner of the Russian Federation
Honoured Military Navigator of the Russian Federation
Honoured Test Navigator of the Russian Federation
Honoured Ecologist of the Russian Federation
Honoured Economist of the Russian Federation
Honoured Engineer of the Power Industry of the Russian Federation
Honoured Lawyer of the Russian Federation
Honoured Worker of Higher Education of the Russian Federation
Honoured Border Guard of the Russian Federation (abolished)
Honoured Officer of the Foreign Intelligence Service of the Russian Federation
Honoured Officer of federal Security Organs of the Russian Federation
Honoured Member of the Diplomatic Service of the Russian Federation
Honoured Officer of the Interior Ministry of the Russian Federation
People's Architect of the Russian Federation
People's Teacher of the Russian Federation
People's Architect of the Russian Federation
Honoured Worker of the Rocket and Space Industry of the Russian Federation
Honoured Customs Officer of the Russian Federation
Honoured Employee of State Security Organs of the Russian Federation
Honoured Worker of the Prosecutor's Office of the Russian Federation
Honoured Employee of Drug Control Authorities of the Russian Federation
Honoured Inventor of the Russian Federation
Honoured Employee of the Investigative Authorities of the Russian Federation
Honoured Worker of the Nuclear Industry of the Russian Federation

See also
Awards and decorations of the Russian Federation
Awards and Emblems of the Ministry of Defense of the Russian Federation
Awards of the Federal Protective Service of the Russian Federation
Awards of the Federal Security Service of the Russian Federation
Awards of the Ministry for Emergency Situations of Russia
Awards of the Ministry of Internal Affairs of Russia
List of awards of independent services of the Russian Federation
List of Heroes of the Russian Federation (K)

Sources
The Russian Gazette 
Site of the President of the Russian Federation 
The Commission on State Awards to the President of the Russian Federation

References

External links

 
Orders, decorations, and medals of Russia
Military awards and decorations of Russia
Civil awards and decorations of Russia